Albert Bernard Unser (October 12, 1912 – July 7, 1995) was a Major League Baseball catcher who played for the Detroit Tigers (1942–1944) and Cincinnati Reds (1945). He was a native of Morrisonville, Illinois and the father of MLB center fielder Del Unser.

Biography
Although Unser's major league career was short, he had a lengthy career in minor league baseball. In , he served as manager of the class-D Gastonia Cardinals of the Tar Heel League, guiding them to the league championship.

In , Unser joined the Tigers' farm system, spending that season with the Beaumont Exporters of the Texas League. He spent most of the  season as a player-manager with the Winston-Salem Twins of the Piedmont League, and at the end of the season he joined the major league club. Unser became one of many baseball players who only appeared in the major leagues during World War II, making his major league debut at age 29 on September 14, 1942, in a home game against the Washington Senators at Briggs Stadium.

Over the next two seasons, Unser played sparingly for Detroit, spending part of each season in the minors with the Buffalo Bisons. In his only full season in the majors, Unser batted .265 in 67 games with 3 home runs and 21 runs batted in (RBI). His career MLB totals for 120 games include a .251 batting average (85-for-338), 4 home runs, 30 RBI, 41 runs, .322 on-base percentage, and a slugging percentage of .355.

In , Unser returned to the minor leagues with the Hollywood Stars of the Pacific Coast League, spending two seasons with the club. In , he played with the minor league Baltimore Orioles, then played for the minor league Milwaukee Brewers the next two seasons. In , he was named the Most Valuable Player of the American Association, batting .293 with 17 home runs. In , Unser returned to managing, serving as player-manager for the Austin Pioneers of the Big State League.

After splitting  among three teams, he returned to the Cardinals organization as essentially a full-time manager and occasional player. While managing the Midwest League Decatur Commodores from 1955 to 1957, he appeared in just 11 and 7 games in the first two seasons, and just a single game in 1957. That year, Unser won his second league championship as a manager. In , he managed the Winston-Salem Red Birds, then spent the next two seasons managing the Keokuk Cardinals. He later served as a scout for the Braves and the Cleveland Indians.

Unser died at the age of 82 in Decatur, Illinois.

External links

Retrosheet

1912 births
1995 deaths
American Association (1902–1997) MVP Award winners
Atlanta Braves scouts
Augusta Rams players
Austin Pioneers players
Baseball players from Illinois
Beaumont Exporters players
Buffalo Bisons (minor league) players
Cedar Rapids Indians players
Cincinnati Reds players
Cleveland Indians scouts
Columbus Red Birds players
Dayton Ducks players
Decatur Commodores players
Detroit Tigers players
Gastonia Cardinals players
Hollywood Stars players
Jacksonville Jax players
Keokuk Cardinals players
Lufkin Lumbermen players
Major League Baseball catchers
Milwaukee Braves scouts
Milwaukee Brewers (minor league) players
Minor league baseball managers
Mobile Shippers players
Paris Pirates players
Scranton Miners players
Sioux City Soos players
Sportspeople from Decatur, Illinois
Tulsa Oilers (baseball) players
Winston-Salem Twins players